John William Jordan (8 November 1921 – 9 January 2016) is an English former professional footballer who played as an inside forward.

Born in Bromley, Kent, he began his career with home-town club Bromley, before moving on to Grays Athletic, West Ham United (as an amateur), and then Tottenham Hotspur. He scored twice on his 'Lilywhites' debut in a 5-1 victory over Sheffield Wednesday at White Hart Lane in August 1947 in the old Second Division.  That season he scored 10 goals in 24 appearances.

He moved to Italy and Juventus in 1948, and subsequently appeared for Birmingham City, Sheffield Wednesday, Tonbridge and Bedford Town.  Jordan died on 9 January 2016 in Cambridge at the age of 94.

References

1921 births
2016 deaths
Footballers from Bromley
English footballers
Association football forwards
Bromley F.C. players
Grays Athletic F.C. players
West Ham United F.C. players
Tottenham Hotspur F.C. players
Juventus F.C. players
Birmingham City F.C. players
Sheffield Wednesday F.C. players
Bedford Town F.C. players
English Football League players
Serie A players
English expatriate footballers
Expatriate footballers in Italy
Tonbridge Angels F.C. players